Abby's is an American sitcom television series created by Josh Malmuth that aired from March 28 to June 13, 2019, on NBC. The series stars Natalie Morales, Neil Flynn, Nelson Franklin, Jessica Chaffin, Leonard Ouzts, and Kimia Behpoornia. In May 2019, the series was canceled after one season.

Premise
Set in San Diego, the series takes place at the home of Abby, a bisexual Latina ex-Marine sergeant, who turned her backyard into an unlicensed bar complete with her own set of rules, which the eclectic set of regulars have to follow.

Cast and characters
 Natalie Morales as Abby, a former Marine sergeant and the owner of the unlicensed bar, Abby's.
 Nelson Franklin as Bill, an engineer and Abby's new landlord who initially disapproves of the bar, but eventually comes around and joins her circle of patrons.
 Jessica Chaffin as Beth, a lawyer-turned housewife and one of the bar's most loyal customers.
 Leonard Ouzts as James, the bouncer for Abby's despite his distaste for confrontation and meek personality.
 Kimia Behpoornia as Rosie Consari, Abby's bar-back and oldest friend.
 Neil Flynn as Fred, a functioning alcoholic who's known Abby since she was a young girl and acts as a father figure to her.

Production

Development
On September 22, 2017, the production, then untitled, received a put pilot commitment from NBC. The pilot was written by Josh Malmuth who was set to executive produce alongside Mike Schur and David Miner. Production companies involved with the pilot were expected to include Universal Television, Fremulon, and 3 Arts Entertainment. On January 23, 2018, NBC officially gave the production a pilot order. A week later, it was announced that Pamela Fryman would direct the pilot.

On May 8, 2018, it was announced that NBC had given the production a series order. A few days later, it was announced that the series would premiere as a mid-season replacement in the spring of 2019. On January 24, 2019, it was announced that the series would premiere on March 28, 2019. The series notably is filmed using a largely outdoor set. On May 30, 2019, NBC canceled the series after a single season.

Casting
On February 22, 2018, it was announced that Natalie Morales had been cast as the titular Abby. In March 2018, it was reported that Nelson Franklin, Jessica Chaffin, Leonard Ouzts, Neil Flynn, and Kimia Behpoornia had joined the cast as series regulars.

Episodes

Reception

Critical response
On review aggregator Rotten Tomatoes, the series holds an approval rating of 73% based on 15 reviews, with an average rating of 6.01/10. The website's critical consensus reads, "Despite some watered down, outdated humor, Abby's brims with potential thanks to its easy going, goofy sensibility and a perfectly cast Natalie Morales." On Metacritic, it has a weighted average score of 60 out of 100, based on 15 critics, indicating "mixed or average reviews".

Ratings

References

External links
 
 

2010s American LGBT-related comedy television series
2010s American sitcoms
2010s American workplace comedy television series
2019 American television series debuts
2019 American television series endings
American LGBT-related sitcoms
Bisexuality-related television series
English-language television shows
Fictional drinking establishments
NBC original programming
Television series by 3 Arts Entertainment
Television series by Fremulon
Television series by Universal Television
Television shows set in San Diego